The 2013 Salina Bombers season was the team's first season as a professional indoor football franchise and first as a member of the Champions Professional Indoor Football League. One of ten teams in the CPIFL for the league's inaugural season, the Salina Bombers were owned by Chris Vercher. The Force played their home games at the Bicentennial Center in Salina, Kansas, under the direction of veteran head coach Bob Frey.

Season summary
With a 9-3 record, the Bombers finished 4th in the final CPIFL standings, which qualified the team for the playoffs. The Bombers traveled to Sioux City, Iowa, where they defeated the first-seeded Sioux City Bandits to advance to the Champions Bowl. In the first-ever Champions Bowl, the Bombers were defeated 47-34 by the Wichita Wild. Despite the loss, head coach Bob Frey was named CPIFL Coach Of Year for 2013.

Awards and honors
2013 Defensive Rookie of The Year: DeWayne Autrey DB
2013 1st Team All CPIFL: Ricky Roberts WR, Jarvis Jones OL, DeWayne Autrey DB
2013 CPIFL Offensive MVP: Dane Simoneau QB
2013 CPIFL Coach Of Year: Bob Frey

Schedule
Key:

Regular season

Post-season

Roster

References

External links
Salina Bombers official website
Salina Bombers at Our Sports Central

Salina Bombers seasons
Salina Bombers
Salina Bombers